Starski is a surname. Notable people with the surname include:

 Allan Starski (born 1943), Polish production designer and set decorator
 Ludwik Starski (1903–1984), Polish Jewish lyricist

Starski is also the moniker of:
 Busy Bee Starski (born David Parker, 1962), American  hip hop musician
 Lovebug Starski (born Kevin Smith, 1960–2018), American MC, musician and record producer

See also
Starsky (disambiguation)
Zdarsky